The Blacksmith of St. Bartholomae (German: Der Schmied von St. Bartholomae) is a 1955 West German drama film directed by Max Michel and starring Viktor Staal, Marianne Koch and Annie Rosar.  It was shot on location at Berchtesgaden in Bavaria and in a makeshift studio nearby. The film's sets were designed by the art director Curt Stallmach. It was part of the postwar boom in heimatfilm that peaked around this year.

Synopsis
After nine years in a Soviet Prisoner of War camp, a former blacksmith returns to his home village in the Alps but has been left emotionally scarred and bitter from his experiences and struggles to settle back in.

Cast
 Viktor Staal as Thomas
 Marianne Koch as 	Marianne
 Heinz Engelmann as 	Martin
 Annie Rosar as Andrea
 Rolf von Nauckhoff as 	Pater Bernhard
 Sepp Rist as 	Gend.-Inspektor
 Gustl Gstettenbaur as 	Max 
 Peter Czejke as Walter 
 Til Kiwe as Ruppert 
 Heinz Schimmelpfennig as Landstreicher
 Franz Loskarn as 	Gend.-Komissar

References

Bibliography
 Bock, Hans-Michael & Bergfelder, Tim. The Concise CineGraph. Encyclopedia of German Cinema. Berghahn Books, 2009.
 Moeller, Robert G. War Stories: The Search for a Usable Past in the Federal Republic of Germany. University of California Press, 2001.

External links 
 

1955 films
1955 drama films
German drama films
West German films
1950s German-language films
Films directed by Max Michel
1950s German films
Films shot in Bavaria
Films set in Bavaria

de:Der Schmied von St. Bartholomae